I Like Mike may refer to:
I Like Mike (film), 1961 Israeli drama film
A slogan used for the Michael Bloomberg 2020 presidential campaign
A slogan used for the Mike Huckabee 2008 presidential campaign